Batyle ignicollis is a species of beetle in the family Cerambycidae. It was described by Say in 1824.

References

Trachyderini
Beetles described in 1824